Pavel Hapal (born 27 July 1969) is a Czech former football player and current manager of Baník Ostrava.

Playing career
Hapal's professional career began at SK Sigma Olomouc. After the club's successful season when they reached the quarter-final of 1991–92 UEFA Cup he signed for Bayer Leverkusen with whom he won the DFB-Pokal in 1993.

During his career he also played for Dukla Prague, CD Tenerife, Sparta Prague and SK Dynamo České Budějovice. At international level he earned 31 caps for Czechoslovakia and later Czech Republic having scored one goal. Hapal ended his career as a player in 2002.

Managerial career
From 2003, he has worked as a manager.

In 2010, he won the Slovak Superliga with MŠK Žilina and entered the 2010-11 Champions League group stage, however his team lost all six of their matches.

On 31 October 2011, he signed a contract with Polish club Zagłębie Lubin.

On 12 March 2014, he signed a contract with Slovakia club FK Senica.

On 6 March 2018, he signed a contract with Czech club AC Sparta Prague.

On 22 October 2018, he became the new manager of Slovakia national football team after Ján Kozák quit. He was fired as coach of Slovakia on 16 October 2020, following Slovakia's shock 2–3 defeat at home to Israel in the 2020–21 UEFA Nations League B.

On 12 October 2022, Hapal became the new manager of Baník Ostrava after Pavel Vrba quit.

Managerial statistics

Honours
 Czechoslovak Football Cup: 1990
 DFB-Pokal: 1992–93
 Corgoň Liga: 2009–10

References

External links

 
 
 

People from Kroměříž
1969 births
Living people
Czechoslovak footballers
Czech footballers
Czechoslovakia international footballers
Czech Republic international footballers
Czech First League players
SK Sigma Olomouc players
Dukla Prague footballers
AC Sparta Prague players
SK Dynamo České Budějovice players
Bayer 04 Leverkusen players
Bundesliga players
La Liga players
CD Tenerife players
Czech football managers
Czech expatriate football managers
Czech First League managers
SFC Opava managers
FC Fastav Zlín managers
FC Baník Ostrava managers
FK Mladá Boleslav managers
MŠK Žilina managers
Zagłębie Lubin managers
Slovak Super Liga managers
Expatriate football managers in Slovakia
Czech expatriate sportspeople in Slovakia
FC Nitra managers
FK Senica managers
AC Sparta Prague managers
Association football midfielders
Slovakia national football team managers
Slovakia national under-21 football team managers
Czech expatriate sportspeople in Germany
Czech expatriate sportspeople in Spain
Expatriate footballers in Germany
Expatriate footballers in Spain
Sportspeople from the Zlín Region